Tiago Coser (born 16 January 2004), sometimes known just as Tiago, is a Brazilian professional footballer who plays as a central defender for Portuguese side Benfica B.

Career statistics

Club

References

External links
Chapecoense official profile 

2004 births
Living people
People from Chapecó
Brazilian footballers
Brazil youth international footballers
Association football defenders
Campeonato Brasileiro Série A players
Associação Chapecoense de Futebol players
S.L. Benfica B players
Brazilian expatriate footballers
Brazilian expatriate sportspeople in Portugal
Expatriate footballers in Portugal
Sportspeople from Santa Catarina (state)